Nashik West Assembly constituency is one of the 288 Vidhan Sabha (legislative assembly) constituencies of Maharashtra state, western India. This constituency is located in Nashik district. It is one of the six assembly segments under Nashik (Lok Sabha constituency).

Geographical scope
The constituency comprises parts of Nashik taluka that come under the Nashik Municipal Corporation viz. ward nos. 21 to 26 and 45 to 60.

Members of Legislative Assembly

Election results

2014

2009

References

Assembly constituencies of Nashik district
Assembly constituencies of Maharashtra